Bienvillers-au-Bois is a commune in the Pas-de-Calais department in the Hauts-de-France region in northern France.

Geography
A farming and light industrial village located 11 miles (18 km) southwest of Arras at the junction of the D2, D8 and D62.

Population

Sights
 The church of St. Jacques, dating from the thirteenth century.
 The war memorial.
 The Commonwealth War Graves Commission cemetery.

See also
Communes of the Pas-de-Calais department

References

External links

 The CWGC cemetery at Bienvillers-au-Bois

Communes of Pas-de-Calais